Joseph Lê Văn Ấn (September 10, 1916 − June 17, 1974) was a Vietnamese Roman Catholic bishop.

Ordained to the priesthood in 1944, Lê Văn Ấn was named bishop of the Roman Catholic Diocese of Xuân Lộc, Vietnam and ordained to the episcopate on January 9, 1966. He died in 1974 while still in office.

References

1916 births
1974 deaths
People from Bình Định province